Happy Go Lucky is an Australian television series which aired in 1961. Produced by Sydney station TCN-9, it also aired on Melbourne station HSV-7, as the two stations had an agreement to share programming with each other in the days before the Nine Network and Seven Network were formed. The combined two previous series, The Lucky Show and The Happy Show.

The series was a mix of variety show and game show, aired in a 30-minute daytime time-slot, and featured George Foster, Walter Elliott and Elizabeth Waterhouse.

References

External links

1961 Australian television series debuts
1961 Australian television series endings
Black-and-white Australian television shows
Australian variety television shows
1960s Australian game shows
English-language television shows
Television game shows with incorrect disambiguation